Mundhal Khurd is a village in the Bhiwani district of the Indian state of Haryana. , the village had 1828 households with a population of 8,837 of which 4,716 were male and 4,121 female.
Khurd and Kalan Persian language word villages have same name then it is distinguished as Kalan means Big and Khurd means Small with Village Name.

References

Villages in Bhiwani district